Hatran is a Unicode block containing characters used on inscriptions discovered at Hatra in Iraq, which are written in the Hatran alphabet and represent a form of the Aramaic language.

History
The following Unicode-related documents record the purpose and process of defining specific characters in the Hatran block:

References 

Unicode blocks